Weedon may refer to:

Places

England
 Weedon, Buckinghamshire, a village
 Weedon Bec, usually called Weedon, a village in Northamptonshire
 Weedon railway station, a former railway station located outside of Weedon Bec
 Weedon, a locality in Newcastle-under-Lyme, Staffordshire

Other places
 Weedon, Quebec, a municipality in Canada
 Weedon Field, an airport near Eufaula, Alabama, US

People

Surname
 Augustus Walford Weedon (1838–1908), English painter
 Basil Weedon (1923–2003), English chemist
 Bert Weedon (1920–2012), English guitarist and composer
 David Weedon (born 1942), Australian dermatopathologist
 George Weedon (1734–1793), American soldier
 George Weedon (gymnast) (1920–2017), English gymnast
 Gerrick Weedon (born 1991), Australian rules footballer
 Harry Weedon (1887–1970), English architect
 Margaret Weedon (1853–1930), English archer

Given name
 Weedon Grossmith (1854–1919), English writer, playwright, actor and painter
 Weedon Osborne (1892–1918), American Navy officer and Medal of Honor recipient

Fictional characters
 Martin and Kate Weedon, an English couple in the British sitcom Benidorm

See also
 Weedon Lois or Lois Weedon, a village in Weston and Weedon civil parish, near Towcester, Northamptonshire, England
 Weeden (disambiguation)
 Whedon, a surname